The 4th Annual Gotham Independent Film Awards, presented by the Independent Filmmaker Project, were held on September 20, 1994. At the ceremony, hosted by Eric Bogosian for the second time, Sam Cohn was honored with a Career Tribute with Joel and Ethan Coen, Sigourney Weaver, Terry Southern and Howard Shore receiving the other individual awards.

Winners

Breakthrough Director (Open Palm Award)
 Rose Troche – Go Fish

Filmmaker Award
 Joel and Ethan Coen

Actor Award
 Sigourney Weaver

Writer Award
 Terry Southern

Below-the-Line Award
 Howard Shore, composer

Career Tribute
 Sam Cohn

References

External links
 

1994
1994 film awards